Ohm Shanthi Oshaana is a 2014 Indian Malayalam-language coming-of-age romantic comedy film co-written and directed by Jude Anthany Joseph. The story was conceived by Midhun Manuel Thomas and he wrote the screenplay along with the director. It stars Nivin Pauly , Nazriya Nazim , and Vineeth Sreenivasan with Renji Panicker, Aju Varghese. Ohm Shanthi Oshaana was produced by Ananya Films and features music by Shaan Rahman.

Ohm Shanthi Oshaana was released on 7 February 2014 with positive reviews from critics and became one of the biggest hits of 2014, with the critics praising Nivin's and Nazriya's performance and won three Kerala State Film Awards including Best Popular Film, Best Actress for Nazriya Nazim and Best Editor for Lijo Paul. The film is remade in Bengali language as Ke Tumi Nandini (2019).

Plot
The film begins in 1983 as Dr. Mathew Devasya anxiously paces the hall outside of a delivery room. He learns that his wife has delivered a baby boy and thanks God for the good news. A stranger comments that Mathew was lucky the baby was not a girl, as he would have had to worry about her all his life. As the stranger says this, a nurse comes out of the delivery room carrying the baby, apologizing that she made a mistake, and confirming that the baby is actually a girl. Mathew glares at the stranger and praises God once again.

The story resumes in 1999 where the baby girl, Pooja Mathew, is now a seventeen year old tomboy in grade 12. She introduces the audience to her parents. Her father is a doctor by profession and enjoys recording and listening to his own renditions of songs. Her mother, a college lecturer by profession, is a sweet and down-to-earth woman who loves cooking and appreciating her own culinary skills. Pooja also has two friends: Neetu, a flirt, and Donna, a foodie.

Pooja recounts her childhood memories of being a tomboy, riding a motorbike, and of her friendship with Rachel Aunty who makes and sells wine as her job. Pooja is her official wine taster. During one of their meetings, she tells Pooja that she can either choose to marry a man she loves or learn to love a stranger that she is forced to marry through arranged marriage. Because of her advice, Pooja decides that she must find someone to love herself.

She settles on Yardley, a popular boy in her school. During a school trip, Yardley approaches Pooja and reveals his crush on her. The next day, she and her friends see a gang of men harassing girls at a waterpark. Pooja gets angry and gets into a fight with them. When one of the gang twists her arm, a man named Giri appears and saves her. Pooja instantly falls for Giri and immediately rejects Yardley, explaining that she cannot accept his proposal as she does not have romantic feelings for him.

Over the course of the rest of the film, Pooja constantly tries to attract the attention of and learn more about Giri, who has now graduated from college and lives as a part-time farmer and Kung Fu sensei. At one point, she learns from her cousin David Kanjyani that his twin, Julie Kanjyani, used to be Giri's girlfriend, but was married off to another man from the US by David and Julie's father, resulting in enmity between Giri and David. She also learns from Rachel that Giri had been considered as a good suitor to her daughter Helen as well. The year is 2000. On Giri's birthday, which also happens to be a Palm Sunday, Pooja decides that she will confess to him with a keychain. When she visits him, it begins to rain and they take shelter in a temple. However, when Pooja tries to declare her love, Giri cuts her off. Telling her that she is just a kid and that she needs to concentrate on her studies because she is destined to become successful, he rejects her. Pooja drops the keychain, and leaves Giri behind into the rain in tears.

Pooja is distraught by Giri's rejection, but focuses on her studies as Giri had requested. She passes her medical entrance exams and goes to Kozhikode Medical College. Pooja tries to contact Giri before leaving, but learns that he was forced to visit China on a Kung Fu Academy trip as he was involved in the love marriage of his friend and the bride's household threatened to kill him. Actress Teenu did the role of the Chinese woman who appears as Giri's wife during a dream Pooja had. At the medical college, she is still friends with Neetu, and another student, Anna. She also befriends a young professor, Dr. Prasad Varkey. During her final year in 2005-06, she runs into Giri again. She confides in Dr. Prasad about Giri and he advises her that enough time has passed and she should pursue him if she is still interested. When Giri's mother is admitted to the hospital, Pooja takes care of her in an effort to get closer to Giri. When Giri's friend Thennal comes to visit, Pooja thinks they are in a relationship and becomes jealous, until she learns that Thennal is already married to Giri's friend.

Pooja comes home to stay with her parents and continues her pursuit of Giri by helping him with his social activities like performing community weddings. Now Giri is 28 and Pooja is 21. During this time, she surprises him by helping to publish a book his mother wrote. Though Pooja thinks Giri has started to care for her, she is heartbroken to learn that Giri is engaged to Sreelakshmi, one of their childhood friends. She learns that David had betrayed Giri in their college days, hence David runs away whenever he sees Giri. One day after Church, David asks Pooja and Giri to help him elope with his love interest Nazeema. After they help him, David gives Giri a letter, telling him only to read it after they've left. When Giri opens the letter, he finds out that David had actually eloped with Sreelakshmi.

Later, Rachel gestures Pooja towards Giri. They go to the same place where Pooja had first proposed to Giri. As she walks up to Giri, he admits that he has loved her all along. He reveals that he kept some memories like the keychain that Pooja originally meant to give him. They get married soon after and Pooja reveals that Dr. Prasad has married Anna, Neetu has married Yardley and that things were going well. Giri has also opened his own KungFu academy. Presently, they (Pooja, Giri and their toddler daughter) are visiting her friend Anna. During their pep-talk, Prasad enquires about the daughter's name to which Giri replies is "Julie" (named after Giri's ex-girlfriend) much to Pooja's annoyance, which she narrates in the end that "men never forget their first lovers".

Cast

Critical reception 

Entertainment website "OneIndia" rated the movie as entertaining, stating that the film has its share of happiness, one-liners and decent performances from the leading pair. The New Indian Express calls Om Shanthi Oshaana  a "‘Peaceful’ Attempt at film making."  "Sify" stated that the director Jude Anthany Joseph "creates an engaging enough drama in Ohm Shanthi Oshaana, that you're happy to emotionally invest in [it]."

Theatrical run
The film completed 100 days in 12 screens. The film collected 6.1 crore in its three weeks in Kerala box office. The film completed 50 days n 25 screens. Overall, the film grossed  at the box office. It was one of the biggest commercial success of 2014 in Malayalam.

Soundtrack 

Ohm Shanti Oshaana music was composed by Shaan Rahman with lyrics by Manu Manjith.

Accolades 
45th Kerala State Film Awards
  Best Film with Popular Appeal and Aesthetic Value
  Best Actress – Nazriya Nazim
  Best Editor  – Lijo Paul
Film Critics Award
 2014 : Atlas Film Critics Award for Best Debutant Director
 2014 : Mohan Raghavan Memorial Award for Best Script 
 2014 : Asiavision Award for Best Family Movie

References

External links 
 Ohm Shanthi Oshaana on Facebook
 

2014 films
2010s Malayalam-language films
Films shot in Kozhikode
Malayalam films remade in other languages
Films scored by Shaan Rahman